Thomas Howard Tackaberry (September 6, 1923 – April 3, 2017) was a lieutenant general in the United States Army. He was a veteran of World War II, the Korean War and the Vietnam War and was a recipient of three Distinguished Service Crosses and served as commander of the XVIII Airborne Corps from 1979 to 1981."Described as a 'grunt's angel', Lt. Gen. Tackaberry was devoted to his men, not only ensuring they were always supplied for the fight but physically prepared as well. Leading from the front, Lt. Gen. Tackaberry set a high bar for fitness with his men and led them on long training runs", stated Richard Hudson to the 115th congressional session on May 19, 2017. Tackaberry is one of the highly decorated officers in the U.S. Army. He ranks among the 10 most decorated military servicemembers in the U.S. military history.

Years of service 

 U.S. Army Reserve 1942–1943
 U.S. Army 1943–1981
 World War II 1942–1945
 Cold War 1945–1981
 Korean War 1952–1953
 Vietnam War 1966–1967, 1969–1970

Korean War

In 1952, while serving as a company commander, he earned the Distinguished Service Cross for heroism near Chorwon, Korea when he voluntarily went to relieve a patrol which had lost its commander. Tackaberry directed the soldiers back toward their own lines and personally covered their retreat at the risk of his own life. He also received two Silver Stars for his service in Korea.

Vietnam War

In 1966 Tackaberry was serving in Vietnam as a lieutenant colonel and earned another Distinguished Service Cross for heroism near Bồng Sơn, South Vietnam, when he led a search and destroy operation in which a 15-man platoon was pinned down and its leader killed. He then ordered his unarmed command helicopter to land near the firefight and ran through intense enemy fire to reach the platoon and assume command. When reinforcements arrived, he led an assault on enemy bunkers, forcing the larger North Vietnamese force to retreat.

In 1969, he had been promoted to colonel and was the brigade commander of the 196th Infantry Brigade when he earned a third Distinguished Service Cross, making him one of the few individuals who had earned three or more Distinguished Service Crosses. Tackaberry also received three more Silver Stars for his service in Vietnam. He then served as chief of staff of the 23rd Infantry Division.

Later life
Tackaberry and his wife Lilian had six children. Their twin sons, Burt and Kief Tackaberry served as officers in the Army. His eldest grandson, Lt Col. Andrew S. Tackaberry took command of 6th Battalion, 37th Field Artillery Regiment from June 2015 to 2017. Another grandson, Lt Col. Jonathan P. Tackaberry took command of 1st Squadron, 17th Cavalry Regiment in May 2017.[ Lt. Gen. Tackaberry retired from military service after 38 years. He then transitioned to managing a real estate business and counseling in the military of the Republic of China for BDC Corp. Tackaberry remained very dedicated to fitness all his life to include at the age of 93 years old and confined to a wheel chair. After being challenged by a family member he completed 10 push-ups on his feet.

Thomas Tackaberry died on April 3, 2017. He was predeceased by his son Richard and daughter Elizabeth. He is buried with full military honors at Arlington National Cemetery on August 23, 2017.

Awards and decorations
His military awards include:

References

External links
Veteran tribute in honor of General Tackaberry

Further reading 
Kelly, B., & Wilcox, D. (1977). Americans. London: Hutchinson &.

Tackaberry, T. (1968). Social Science Research, Aid to Counterinsurgency. The American Journal of Economics and Sociology, 27(1), 1–8.Tackaberry, & Army War Coll Carlisle Barracks PA. (1966). US Military Personnel—Instrumentalities in Foreign Affairs.

Snider,Don.(1980) Vol. 116 No. 4 Time magazine-In Florida- Jumping with the 82nd

FA Journal 1976 (FIST in FA Bns at Ft Bragg) Volume 44 September–October 1976 Number 5

Wilcox, D. (writer). (n.d.). The Americans [Video file]. Retrieved from https://www.imdb.com/title/tt1989737/

1923 births
2017 deaths
United States Army generals
United States Army personnel of World War II
United States Army personnel of the Korean War
United States Army personnel of the Vietnam War
Recipients of the Distinguished Service Cross (United States)
Recipients of the Defense Distinguished Service Medal
Recipients of the Distinguished Service Medal (US Army)
Recipients of the Silver Star
Recipients of the Legion of Merit
Recipients of the Distinguished Flying Cross (United States)
Recipients of the Air Medal
Recipients of the Soldier's Medal
People from Los Angeles
Military personnel from California